Centroctena rutherfordi is a moth of the family Sphingidaefirst described by Herbert Druce in 1882. It is known from forests from Sierra Leone to Uganda and western Kenya. It is also found in the Usambara Mountains of north-eastern Tanzania.

The length of the forewings is 30–34 mm. The body is dark olive brown with longitudinal black lines. There is a large lateral black spot at the base of the abdomen. The forewings are evenly crenulated at the margin, dark olive brown and speckled and mottled with ochreous and black. There is a straight black line running from the base to the apex, followed by a creamy band, the proximal half of which is straight, the distal half undulate. The submarginal area is ochreous green and the termen and cilia are very dark brown except below the apex, where they are chequered with cream. The hindwings are evenly crenulate at the margin and uniform dark brown.

References

Macroglossini
Moths described in 1882
Insects of Cameroon
Moths of Africa
Insects of Uganda
Fauna of the Central African Republic
Fauna of Gabon
Insects of Tanzania